Global Strategy Forum was founded by Michael Ancram MP (now Lord Lothian) and Johan Eliasch in 2006 to generate open debate and discussion on key foreign affairs, defence and international security issues. GSF is an independent, non-party political, non-ideological organisation, which aims to provide a platform to explore some of the more challenging and contentious aspects of UK foreign policy and to stimulate imaginative ideas and innovative thinking in a rapidly changing global landscape.

Michael Ancram delivered the Forum’s inaugural lecture in May 2006, entitled ‘A Fork In The Road – Sorting Out The UK’s Defence Policy Debacle’.  Since then, GSF has continued to hold a regular events programme.

GSF publishes an annual compendium of lectures and an occasional series of monographs, as well as collections of essays and articles by foreign affairs experts.

References 
The Daily Telegraph
http://www.publications.parliament.uk/pa/ld200607/ldhansrd/text/70221-0003.htm
https://web.archive.org/web/20100607133947/http://www.brookings.edu/events/2008/0131_climate.aspx
https://web.archive.org/web/20120927030420/http://www.thecommonwealth.org/speech/181889/34293/35178/152062/165655/post_neo_conservative.htm 
http://news.bbc.co.uk/1/hi/uk_politics/6261820.stm 
https://web.archive.org/web/20110726071704/http://www.fwdeklerk.org/cause_data/images/2137/09_11_16_National_Strategic_Forum_London.pdf
The Daily Telegraph
https://web.archive.org/web/20110718212927/http://meconsult.clients-lounge.de/join.php/newsletter/weg-update
http://www.egemenbagis.com/web/21-14968-1-1/egemen_bagis_en/medya/haberler/europe_needs_to_discuss_its_taboos
https://web.archive.org/web/20100210073827/http://www.turkishweekly.net/news/97364/turkish-state-minister-european-union-is-not-such-important-to-sacrifice-the-cyprus.html
http://www.cyprus.gov.cy/moi/pio/pio.nsf/All/44E6E5BDA1F3B00CC22576C500437D0C?OpenDocument
http://toplevelgroup.org/events/
https://web.archive.org/web/20110205001421/http://nuclearinfo.org/node/2110 
http://www.defenceviewpoints.co.uk/tag/global-strategy-forum-lectures
http://conflictsforum.org/index.php?s=dahlan
http://www.parliament.uk/business/news/2010/10/michael-ancram-announcement/ 
https://web.archive.org/web/20110718213825/http://meconsult.clients-lounge.de/join.php/GPF/20080812043228149136620/200808120436211097759551
http://wn.com/Interview_with_General_Sir_Richard_Dannatt 
https://web.archive.org/web/20101214124343/http://chathamhouse.org.uk/events/view/-/id/1769/ 
http://www.head.com/corporate/biographies.php?id=1
https://web.archive.org/web/20110927072052/http://www.henryjacksonsociety.org/stories.asp?id=1079 
http://politics.guardian.co.uk/gordonbrown/page/0,,2164466,00.html 
https://web.archive.org/web/20110718230227/http://www.carnegiecouncil.org/resources/transcripts/0237.html 
http://crossick.blogactiv.eu/2010/02/09/china%E2%80%99s-challenge-to-american-hegemony/ 
http://conflictsforum.org/2008/the-middle-east-peace-process-the-case-for-jaw-jaw-not-war-war/
https://web.archive.org/web/20110707222928/http://www.bellpottinger-sansfrontieres.com/jonathan-lehrle
http://www.mepc.org/create-content/speech/chinas-challenge-american-hegemony 
http://desertonfire.blogspot.com/search/label/Global%20Strategy%20Forum
http://www.defenceviewpoints.co.uk/reviews/the-shanghai-cooperation-organisation-a-networking-organisation-for-a-networking-world

External links 
 https://web.archive.org/web/20101009231631/http://www.globalstrategyforum.org/default.asp

Political organisations based in the United Kingdom